Central Scotland (Meadhan-Alba in Gaelic) is one of the eight electoral regions of the Scottish Parliament which were created in 1999. Nine of the parliament's 73 first past the post constituencies are sub-divisions of the region and it elects seven of the 56 additional-member Members of the Scottish Parliament (MSPs). Thus it elects a total of 16 MSPs.

Constituencies and council areas 2011– 

As a result of the First Periodic Review of Scottish Parliament Boundaries the boundaries for the region and constituencies were redrawn for the 2011 Scottish Parliament election.

Constituencies and council areas 1999–2011 

The constituencies were created in 1999 with the names and boundaries of Westminster constituencies, as existing in at that time. They cover all of two council areas, the Falkirk council area and the North Lanarkshire council area, and parts of three others, the East Ayrshire council area, the East Dumbartonshire council area and the South Lanarkshire council area.

The rest of the East Ayrshire council area is within the South of Scotland region, the rest of the East Dunbartonshire council area is within the West of Scotland region, and the rest of the South Lanarkshire council area is within the Glasgow and South of Scotland regions.

Boundary changes

The Boundary Commission recommended changes to the electoral regions used to elect "list" members of the Scottish Parliament. The new "Central Scotland" region was formed from the constituencies of Airdrie and Shotts; Coatbridge and Chryston; Cumbernauld and Kilsyth; East Kilbride; Falkirk East; Falkirk West; Hamilton, Lanark and Stonehouse; Motherwell and Wishaw; and Uddingston and Bellshill.

Members of the Scottish Parliament

Constituency MSPs

Regional list MSPs
N.B. This table is for presentation purposes only

Election results

2021 Scottish Parliament election 
In the 2021 Scottish Parliament election the region elected MSPs as follows:
 9 SNP MSPs (constituency members)
 3 Labour MSPs (additional members)
 3 Conservative MSPs (additional members)
 1 Green MSP (additional member)

Constituency results 
{| class=wikitable
!colspan=4 style=background-color:#f2f2f2|2021 Scottish Parliament election: Central Scotland
|-
! colspan=2 style="width: 200px"|Constituency
! style="width: 150px"|Elected member
! style="width: 300px"|Result

Additional Member results

2016 Scottish Parliament election
In the 2016 Scottish Parliament election the region elected MSPs as follows:
 9 SNP MSPs (constituency members)
 4 Labour MSPs (additional members)
 3 Conservative MSPs (additional members)

Constituency results
{| class=wikitable
!colspan=4 style=background-color:#f2f2f2|2016 Scottish Parliament general election: Central Scotland
|-
! colspan=2 style="width: 200px"|Constituency
! style="width: 150px"|Elected member
! style="width: 300px"|Result

Additional Member results
{| class=wikitable
!colspan=8 style=background-color:#f2f2f2|2016 Scottish Parliament election: Central Scotland
|-
! colspan="2" style="width: 150px"|Party
! Elected candidates
! style="width: 40px"|Seats
! style="width: 40px"|+/−
! style="width: 50px"|Votes
! style="width: 40px"|%
! style="width: 40px"|+/−%
|-

2011 Scottish Parliament election
In the 2011 Scottish Parliament election the region elected MSPs as follows:
 9 Scottish National Party MSPs (six constituency members and three additional members)
 6 Labour MSPs (three constituency members and three additional members)
 1 Conservative MSP (additional member)

Constituency results
{| class=wikitable
!colspan=4 style=background-color:#f2f2f2|Scottish Parliament general election, 2011: Central Scotland
|-
! colspan=2 style="width: 200px"|Constituency
! style="width: 150px"|Elected member
! style="width: 300px"|Result

Additional Member results
{| class=wikitable
!colspan=8 style=background-color:#f2f2f2|2011 Scottish Parliament election: Central Scotland
|-
! colspan="2" style="width: 150px"|Party
! Elected candidates
! style="width: 40px"|Seats
! style="width: 40px"|+/−
! style="width: 50px"|Votes
! style="width: 40px"|%
! style="width: 40px"|+/−%
|-

2007 Scottish Parliament election

Constituency results 
{| class=wikitable
!colspan=4 style=background-color:#f2f2f2|2007 Scottish Parliament election: Central Scotland
|-
! colspan=2 style="width: 200px"|Constituency
! style="width: 150px"|Elected member
! style="width: 300px"|Result

Additional member results
{| class=wikitable
!colspan=8 style=background-color:#f2f2f2|2007 Scottish Parliament election: Central Scotland
|-
! colspan="2" style="width: 150px"|Party
! Elected candidates
! style="width: 40px"|Seats
! style="width: 40px"|+/−
! style="width: 50px"|Votes
! style="width: 40px"|%
! style="width: 40px"|+/−%
|-

2003 Scottish Parliament election
In the 2003 Scottish Parliament election the region elected MSPs as follows:

 9 Labour MSPs (nine constituency members)
 3 Scottish National Party MSPs (three additional members)
 1 Independent MSP (one constituency member)
 1 Conservative MSP (one additional member)
 1 Liberal Democrat MSP (one additional member)
 1 Scottish Senior Citizens MSP (one additional member)
 1 Scottish Socialist Party MSP (one additional member)

Constituency results 
{| class=wikitable
!colspan=4 style=background-color:#f2f2f2|2003 Scottish Parliament election: Central Scotland
|-
! colspan=2 style="width: 200px"|Constituency
! style="width: 150px"|Elected member
! style="width: 300px"|Result

Additional member results
{| class=wikitable
!colspan=8 style=background-color:#f2f2f2|2003 Scottish Parliament election: Central Scotland
|-
! colspan="2" style="width: 150px"|Party
! Elected candidates
! style="width: 40px"|Seats
! style="width: 40px"|+/−
! style="width: 50px"|Votes
! style="width: 40px"|%
! style="width: 40px"|+/−%
|-

1999 Scottish Parliament election 
In the 1999 Scottish Parliament election the region elected MSPs as follows:

 9 Labour MSPs (nine constituency members)
 5 Scottish National Party MSPs (five additional members)
 1 Independent (one constituency member)
 1 Conservative MSP (one additional member)
 1 Liberal Democrat MSPs (one additional member)

Constituency results 
{| class=wikitable
!colspan=4 style=background-color:#f2f2f2|1999 Scottish Parliament election: Central Scotland
|-
! colspan=2 style="width: 200px"|Constituency
! style="width: 150px"|Elected member
! style="width: 300px"|Result

Additional member results 
{| class=wikitable
!colspan=8 style=background-color:#f2f2f2|1999 Scottish Parliament election: Central Scotland
|-
! colspan="2" style="width: 150px"|Party
! Elected candidates
! style="width: 40px"|Seats
! style="width: 40px"|+/−
! style="width: 50px"|Votes
! style="width: 40px"|%
! style="width: 40px"|+/−%
|-

Footnotes 

Politics of Falkirk (council area)
Scottish Parliamentary regions
Politics of South Lanarkshire
Scottish Parliament constituencies and regions 1999–2011
Scottish Parliament constituencies and regions from 2011
Politics of North Lanarkshire